Kongque is the Chinese name for peacock.

Kongque may also refer to:
 Kongque River, a river in Xinjiang, China
 Peacock (2005 film)